Arshad Sami Khan (January 8, 1942 – June 22, 2009) was a Pakistani diplomat, civil servant and fighter pilot who at peak of his career attained the highest rank of Federal Secretary. He started his career as a Pakistan Air Force fighter pilot and later served three presidents of Pakistan as their aide-de-camp (ADC) and later went on to the Ministry of Foreign Affairs where he served three presidents and four prime ministers as chief of protocol. He was later appointed as a diplomatic ambassador of Pakistan to 14 countries. This was followed by his appointment as the first commissioner general of Pakistan. He was also Federal Secretary of Culture and retired as a top BPS-22 grade bureaucratic officer. He was also the father of singer and music composer Adnan Sami.

Personal life
Arshad Sami Khan was born in January 1942 into an ethnic Pashtun family that had migrated from Afghanistan. His paternal grandfather, General Mehfooz Jan hailed from Herat, Afghanistan and was the governor of 4 provinces in Afghanistan, namely Herat, Kabul, Jalalabad and Balkh, under the Reign of King Amanullah Khan. Khan's paternal great-grandfather General Ahmed Jan was the civil and military adviser as well as the physician to King Ameer Abdur Rahman Khan. General Ahmed Jan, the father of Gen. Mafooz Jan, was the conqueror of Kafiristan and named it Nuristan. However, at the time of the revolution during at which Habibullah Kalakani became the first ruler of Persian descent in Afghanistan since Ahmad shah Abdali. Habibullah Kalakani with the support of the General Afghan population removed King Amanullah for his failure to bring any positive or foundational changes in Afghanistan that Khan's paternal grandfather, General Mehfooz Jan was executed, and as a result the family had to migrate to Peshawar which was a part of British India at that time.

Pakistan Air Force
Khan decided in his early years to follow the military traditions of his forefathers and joined the Pakistan Air Force. He became a national hero and was awarded the Sitara-e-Jurat, Pakistan's third highest military medal of honour for bravery. His name is honoured at the Pakistan Air Force Museum in Karachi. He was also the youngest recipient of the prestigious "Best Fighter Pilot's Trophy".

Khan also had the distinction of serving three presidents of Pakistan as their aide-de-camp (ADC); namely presidents Ayub Khan, Yahya Khan and Zulfiqar Ali Bhutto.

He retired from the Air Force in 1972 and joined the Foreign Service on the behest of President Zulfiqar Ali Bhutto.

Ambassador
Arshad Sami Khan was appointed Pakistan's first Ambassador to Estonia in August 1993 along with serving as Ambassador to three other Scandinavian countries simultaneously; Sweden, Denmark and Norway. He served as Ambassador of Pakistan to ten other countries.

He was the chief of protocol to presidents Ghulam Ishaq Khan, Wasim Sajjad and Farooq A. Leghari and also served as Chief of Protocol to Prime Ministers Benazir Bhutto, Ghulam Mustafa Jatoi and Nawaz Sharif. Khan went on to become the first Commissioner General of Pakistan (appointed by Benazir Bhutto) and then a Federal Secretary to the Government of Pakistan. On the occasion of Independence Day on 14 August 2012, the President of Pakistan posthumously conferred Khan the  third highest Civilian Award of Sitara-i-Imtiaz to honour his services to Pakistan.

Author
Khan wrote a book about his experience as an aide-de-camp entitled Three Presidents and an Aide, which was released in March 2008 and went on to become a best-seller in South Asia. The book is a candid eyewitness account of historical events, seen from within the 'ring-side' that occurred during the reign of three presidents: Ayub Khan, Yahya Khan and Zulfiqar Ali Bhutto. No publisher in Pakistan was willing to publish the book. It was therefore published and released in India, launched by former Indian prime minister I.K. Gujral to rave reviews and sales.

Illness
Khan was diagnosed with pancreatic cancer in 1989. Prime Minister Benazir Bhutto had him flown to London, where he was operated at Cromwell Hospital. However, within three months of the operation thereafter, he resumed working in the Foreign Office, continuing his ambassadorial assignments around the world while battling cancer for 20 years. He died on 22 June 2009 at 'Kokilaben Dhirubhai Ambani' Hospital in Mumbai. His burial ceremony took place in Islamabad with military honours, including a 21-gun salute.

Awards
 Best Fighter Pilot's Trophy
 Military Medal of Honour from King Hussain of Jordan
 Military Medal of Honour from the Shah of Iran
 Military Medal of Honour from Turkey
 Special Medal for Services to Humanity from the United Nations
 Sitara-i-Imtiaz (posthumous; 2012)
 Sitara-e-Jurat

Sitara-e-Jurat Citation 
For his gallantry actions during the 1965 War, Sami was awarded the Sitara-e-Jurat, the third highest gallantry award of Pakistan.

His Sitara-e-Jur'at citation read as follows:

References

1942 births
2009 deaths
Ambassadors of Pakistan to Estonia
Ambassadors of Pakistan to Denmark
Ambassadors of Pakistan to Norway
Ambassadors of Pakistan to Sweden
Deaths from pancreatic cancer
Pakistan Air Force officers
Pakistani aviators
Pashtun people
People from Islamabad
Recipients of Sitara-i-Imtiaz
Recipients of Sitara-e-Jurat
Ambassadors of Pakistan to Portugal
Pakistani people of Afghan descent